The Barbary Crusade, also called the Mahdia Crusade, was a Franco-Genoese military expedition in 1390 that led to the siege of Mahdia, then a stronghold of the Barbary pirates in Hafsidi Ifriqiya (geographically corresponding to modern Tunisia). Froissart's Chronicles is the chief account of what was one of the last crusades.

Background
During the lulls of the Hundred Years War knights looked for opportunities for glory and honor.
As Genoese ambassadors approached the French king Charles VI to subscribe to a crusade, they eagerly supported the plan to fight Muslim pirates from North Africa. These pirates had their main base at Mahdia on the Barbary coast. Genoa was ready to supply ships, supplies, 12,000 archers and 8,000 foot soldiers, if France would provide the knights. The proposal by the doge Antoniotto Adorno was presented as a crusade. As such it would give prestige to its participants, a moratorium on their debts, immunity from lawsuits, and papal indulgence. The French force also included some English participants and consisted of 1,500 knights under the leadership of Louis II, Duke of Bourbon.

Siege of Mahdia
A relief army reportedly 40,000 men strong was brought up by Hafsid Sultan Abu al-Abbas Ahmad II supported by the kings of Bejaia and Tlemcen (Bejaia sent it out of obligation, while Tlemcen feared that the loss of Mahdia would result in a Domino effect) camped nearby, avoided pitched battle, but started to harass the crusaders. The Crusaders had to build a wall around their camp and fortify it. The Berbers sent out a negotiating party asking why the French would attack them, they had only troubled the Genoese, a natural affair among neighbors. In answer they were told that they were unbelievers who had "crucified and put to death the son of God called Jesus Christ." The Berbers laughed saying it was the Jews not they who had done that. Negotiations broke off.

In a subsequent encounter with the large relief army the Crusaders killed many but eventually had to retreat exhausted and tired. The duration of the siege not only frustrated them, but their logistical systems started to weaken. When a final assault on the city was repelled they were ready to settle for a treaty. On the opposing side the Berbers realized that they could not overcome the heavier armed invaders. Both sides looked for a way to end the hostilities.

Lifting the siege
The siege was lifted with the conclusion of a treaty negotiated through the Genoese party. The treaty stipulated a ten-year armistice. By mid-October the Crusaders had returned to Genoa. Losses due to the fighting and disease amounted to 274 knights and squires.

Aftermath
Both sides celebrated victory. The Berbers had repelled the invaders, and the Genoese could conduct trade with less interference. The French knights had no tangible goals but had participated for action and glory. They failed to learn any lessons from a "chivalric adventure with religious overlay". Their mistakes of unfamiliarity with the environment, lack of heavy siege equipment, underestimation of the enemy, and internal quarrels were repeated six years later on a grander scale in their fatal last crusade at Nicopolis.

Notable participants 
Louis II, Duke of Bourbon
Philip of Artois, Count of Eu
Admiral Jean de Vienne
Enguerrand VII, Lord of Coucy
John of Nevers
John Beaufort, 1st Earl of Somerset
Geoffrey Boucicaut
Jean d'Harcourt VII
Henry Scrope, 3rd Baron Scrope of Masham
Gadifer de la Salle
Jean de Béthencourt

References

Further reading
Brachthäuser, Urs. Der Kreuzzug gegen Mahdiya 1390. Konstruktionen eines Ereignisses im spätmittelalterlichen Mediterraneum. Mittelmeerstudien, 14. Leiden: Brill, 2017.
Hazard, Harry W. "Moslem North Africa, 1049–1394", pp. 457–485. In Harry W. Hazard, ed., A History of the Crusades, Volume III: The Fourteenth and Fifteenth Centuries. Madison, WI: University of Wisconsin Press, 1975.
Mirot, Léon. "Une expédition française en Tunisie au XIVe siècle: le siège de Mahdia, 1390". Revue des études historiques, 47 (1931), 357–406.

External links

Conflicts in 1390
Sieges
Battles involving France
Battles involving the Republic of Genoa
Battles of the Crusades
13th century in Ifriqiya
Military history of Tunisia
14th century in Ifriqiya
1390
History of Mahdia